Patrik Georg Fabian de Laval (16 April 1883 – 10 March 1970) was a Swedish sport shooter and modern pentathlete who competed in the 1912 Summer Olympics. He was part of the Swedish team that won the silver medal in the 50 m team military pistol event. Individually he won a bronze medal in the first-contested modern pentathlon.

De Laval was born of a Swedish noble family. In 1913 he married baroness Ebba Fleetwood, the eldest daughter of baron Carl Fleetwood, 10th baron of Jälunda, and his first wife countess Hedvig, née Lewenhaupt. His brothers Patrik and Erik were also Olympic pentathletes.

See also
 Dual sport and multi-sport Olympians

References

External links
 

1883 births
1970 deaths
Swedish male modern pentathletes
Swedish male sport shooters
Shooters at the 1912 Summer Olympics
Modern pentathletes at the 1912 Summer Olympics
Olympic shooters of Sweden
Olympic modern pentathletes of Sweden
Olympic silver medalists for Sweden
Olympic bronze medalists for Sweden
Olympic medalists in modern pentathlon
Olympic medalists in shooting
Medalists at the 1912 Summer Olympics
Swedish people of French descent
Sportspeople from Stockholm
19th-century Swedish nobility
20th-century Swedish people